The Union of Service Workers was a trade union representing hospitality workers, municipal workers, and workers in local industries, in Yugoslavia.

The union was established in 1963, when the Union of Communal and Craft Workers merged with the Union of Workers in Trade, Catering and Tourism.  Like both its predecessors, it affiliated to the Confederation of Trade Unions of Yugoslavia.  By 1965, it claimed 499,000 members.

In 1974, the union was split into the Commerce Workers' Union, the Union of Craftworkers, the Catering and Tourism Workers' Union and the Public Utilities and Handicraft Workers' Union.

References

Hospitality industry trade unions
Trade unions established in 1963
Trade unions disestablished in 1974
Trade unions in Yugoslavia